Atlético Indio was a Honduran football club.

It was based in Tegucigalpa, Honduras. They were relegated to second division after the 1991–92 season.

Achievements
Segunda División
Winners (3): 1966–67, 1990–91, 1996–97

League performance

Defunct football clubs in Honduras